Lena Żelichowska (12 August 1910 – 14 October 1958) was a Polish stage and film actress. She appeared in fourteen films between 1933 and 1940.

Selected filmography
 Black Pearl (1934)
 Róża (1936)
 Barbara Radziwiłłówna (1936)
 A Diplomatic Wife (1937)

References

External links

1910 births
1958 deaths
Polish film actresses
Actresses from Warsaw
Polish stage actresses
Polish female dancers
Polish emigrants to the United States
Polish cabaret performers
Burials at Powązki Cemetery
20th-century Polish actresses
20th-century comedians